Streptomyces panacagri is a Gram-positive, spore-forming and aerobic bacterium species from the genus of Streptomyces which has been isolated from soil from a ginseng field in the Pocheon in South Korea.

See also 
 List of Streptomyces species

References

Further reading

External links
Type strain of Streptomyces panacagri at BacDive -  the Bacterial Diversity Metadatabase	

panacagri
Bacteria described in 2012